Daniil Yevgenyevich Markov (born 30 July 1976) is a Russian former professional ice hockey defenceman who played a nine-year career in the National Hockey League. He also played 11 seasons in the top tier Russian leagues.

Playing career
As a youth, Markov played in the 1990 Quebec International Pee-Wee Hockey Tournament with a minor ice hockey team from Moscow.

Markov began his career in 1993, playing for HC Spartak Moscow in Russia. The Toronto Maple Leafs of the NHL drafted him in the 9th round of the 1995 NHL Entry Draft. However, partway through the 1996–97 season, he left Moscow and began playing for the Maple Leafs' farm team, the St. John's Maple Leafs. He made the jump to the NHL at the end of the 1997–98 season. 

After four seasons in Toronto, he was traded to the Phoenix Coyotes for Travis Green, Robert Reichel, and Craig Mills. He played two seasons for the Coyotes before joining the Carolina Hurricanes for the 2003–04 season; once again, he was traded to the Philadelphia Flyers for forward Justin Williams partway through the season. On March 5, 2004, he scored the 10,000th goal in Flyers history against Patrick Lalime and the Ottawa Senators during a 5–3 win at the Wachovia Center. 

In the time leading up to the 2005–06, the Flyers found themselves in potential trouble with the new salary cap and needed to unload some salary. Thus, they traded Markov to the Nashville Predators for a third round pick in the 2006 NHL Entry Draft. On 26 July 2006, the Detroit Red Wings signed Markov as a free agent. Markov then signed a two-year contract with Dynamo Moscow in Russia. 

Markov is noted for his toughness. One game which Markov played for the Leafs involved him receiving an injury below his eye which required stitches. He took the stitches without anesthetic in order to keep playing. Markov is also well known for returning to Jaromír Jágr his infamous "goal-salute" after the Maple Leafs knocked the Penguins out of the 1999 NHL playoffs during an Eastern Conference Semi-Finals overtime win.

Career statistics

Regular season and playoffs

International

References

External links

 

1976 births
Living people
Carolina Hurricanes players
HC CSKA Moscow players
Detroit Red Wings players
HC Dynamo Moscow players
HC Spartak Moscow players
Ice hockey players at the 2002 Winter Olympics
Ice hockey players at the 2006 Winter Olympics
Medalists at the 2002 Winter Olympics
Nashville Predators players
Olympic bronze medalists for Russia
Olympic ice hockey players of Russia
Olympic medalists in ice hockey
Philadelphia Flyers players
Phoenix Coyotes players
Russian ice hockey defencemen
St. John's Maple Leafs players
Ice hockey people from Moscow
Toronto Maple Leafs draft picks
Toronto Maple Leafs players
HC Vityaz players